Davoll's General Store is a general store in the Russells Mills Village Historic District in Dartmouth, Massachusetts, United States. It is owned by Will, and his brother Ben Shattuck. It is the oldest continually operating General Store in Massachusetts, established in 1793. It is on the National Register of Historic Places, coupled with the entire Russells Mills area.

History 
The building where the store would be created was purchased in 1780 by Michael Wainer, who sold the building to William Howland in 1792. But Howland didn't start using the building as a general store until 1793. The store passed hands several time over the course of the 1800's. But primarily stayed in the hands of the Howlands, Tuckers, and Slocums. In the bottom half of the 19th century the store went by the name of Slocum's store, until it was purchased by the Davolls at the start of the 20th century when its name changed to Davolls General Store. The Davolls co-owned the store with Nancy Slocum and Australian Whaler John Thomas Sherratt. Following the Davolls ownership of the store it retained the same name and passed through several more owners, including a 42 year stint by the Morrisons and Glennons.

Throughout its entire history Davolls sold a variety of everyday items constituting the normal purpose of a general store. The store used to be home to a post office, which served as Zip Code 02714 and served the Russels Mills area from the 19th century until 2014. In 1810 the postmaster was Abraham Tucker. Davolls also used to sell gasoline, with both a pump and a tank located outside the store before failing an annual pressure test.

The store was completely overhauled during the Arruda and Chouinard ownership period. The owners conducted an award-winning renovation for the first year and a half of their store ownership period.

Ownership history 

 Ben and Will Shattuck (2021-present)
 Kim Arruda and Jim Chouinard (2016-2021)
 Wilfred & Virginia Morrison, Beverly Morrison Glennon and Dr. Joseph R. Glennon (1974-2016)
 Nancy Slocum, John Thomas Sherratt, Frank Davoll, & Raymond Davoll (1901-1974)
 William Allen & James H Slocum (1862-1901)
 Charles Tucker (1851-1862)
 William Tucker (1849-1851)
 Rebecca Church with ½ interest to Abner Tucker, and Nancy and Benjamin Potter ½ interest to Abner Tucker (1842-1849)
 Henry & Benjamin Tucker (1810-1842)
 Caleb Slocum (1809-1810)
 Jonathan Allen (1805-1809)
 Benjamin Cummings & Joshua Howland (1801-1805)
 William Howland (1793-1801)

Services 
Davolls offers a variety of produce, keeping in its history as a general store. Including candles, penny candy, honey, fresh produce, eggs, and local red meat. However, they also contain an independent bookstore, a cafe, and a bar serving draft beer. Outside the store a functioning antique telephone can be used to make calls, including a number that contains prerecorded messages from Ben Shattucks wife, Jenny Slate.

References

External links 
 Davolls General Store official website

Dartmouth, Massachusetts
General stores in the United States
1793 establishments in Massachusetts